Thousand Buddha Rock (千佛岩 or 四川省中国旅行社) is located in Renshou County, Sichuan. It contains over 21 different Buddhist carvings on rock. Many of the carvings were first made around the year 881 during the Tang dynasty, with work extending into the Qing dynasty. Previously some of these carvings were covered by the Qingyi River until exposed by the rising global temperatures. The condition of the carvings has suffered due to vandalism and neglect. The tallest Buddha is 2.7 m high.

Further reading

References

See also
 Leshan Giant Buddha
 Renshou Giant Buddha

Buddhist sites in China
Religion in Sichuan
Buddhist buildings in Sichuan
881 beginnings